An acousto-optic deflector (AOD) spatially controls the optical beam.  In the operation of an acousto-optic deflector the power driving the acoustic transducer is kept on, at a constant level, while the acoustic frequency is varied to deflect the beam to different angular positions.  The acousto-optic deflector makes use of the acoustic frequency dependent diffraction angle, where a change in the angle  as a function of the change in frequency  given as,

 

AOM technology has made practical the Bose–Einstein condensation for which the 2001 Nobel Prize in Physics was awarded to Eric A. Cornell, Wolfgang Ketterle and Carl E. Wieman. Another application of acoustic-optical deflection is optical trapping of small molecules.

AODs are essentially the same as acousto-optic modulators (AOMs).  In both an AOM and an AOD, the amplitude and frequency of different orders are adjusted as light is diffracted.

See also 
 Acousto-optic modulator
 Acousto-optics
 Acousto-optical spectrometer
 Nonlinear optics
 Sonoluminescence

References 

Acoustics